List of draughts players is concerned with the leading or champion figures in the history of various forms of draughts. The list should be limited to those who are notable in the game or its history.

Champions or masters in variants of draughts

  
Alatenghua 
Alex Moiseyev
Alexander Baljakin
Alexander Dybman 
Alexander Georgiev 
Alexander Getmanski (also spelled as "Aleksandr Getmanski") 
Aleksander Kandaurov
Alexander Schwarzman 
Alexei Chizhov 
Alfred Dussaut
Alfred Jordan  - A World Checkers/Draughts Champion
Alfred Molimard 
Amangul Durdyyeva
Anatoli Gantvarg

Andrew Anderson
Andris Andreiko 
Arnaud Cordier
Asa Long 
Baba Sy
Ben Springer 

Carl "Buster" Smith - Champion in Pool checkers.
Charles Walker 
Cornelius "Con" McCarrick
Darya Tkachenko
Dennis Pawlek
Derek Oldbury 
Don Lafferty
Dul Erdenebileg
Edvardas Bužinskis
Edwin Hunt
Elbert Lowder
Elena Altsjoel - A Women's International Draughts Champion 
Elena Mikhailovskaya - First Women's International Draughts Champion 
Eugène Leclercq  - A Men's International Draughts Champion 

Guntis Valneris
Hanqing Zhao
Harm Wiersma
Herman Hoogland

Ion Dosca
Iser Kuperman
Isidore Weiss
Jack de Haas
Jake Kacher
James Ferrie - A World Checkers/Draughts Champion
James Wyllie
Jan Mortimer 
Jannes van der Wal 
Jean Marc Ndjofang 
 
 
Leopold Sekongo  
Li Tchoan King  
Lindus Edwards
Lourival Mendes França 
Lubabalo Kondlo 
Lukas Valenta
Marcel Deslauriers
Future Is Near
Marion Tinsley  - He is considered the greatest American-checkers player ever. 
Marius Fabre 
Maurice Raichenbach

Michele Borghetti 
Nadiya Chyzhevska
Natalia Sadowska
N'Diaga Samb
Newell W. Banks
Nina Hoekman
Olga Kamyshleeva - A Women's International Draughts Champion
Olga Levina

Patricia Breen
Pierre Ghestem
Piet Roozenburg

Rashid Nezhmetdinov 
 
Richard Fortman
Rob Clerc 
Robert Martins - A World Checkers/Draughts Champion
Robert Stewart - A World Checkers/Draughts Champion
Robert D. Yates
Roel Boomstra
Ron King
Ryan Pronk
Sam Gonotsky
Stanislas Bizot
Tamara Tansykkuzhina 
Tanja Chub
Ton Sijbrands
Vadim Virny
Viktoriya Motrichko
Vladimir Kaplan
Vyacheslav Shchyogolev
Walter Hellman
William F. Ryan

Yulia Makarenkova
Zoja Golubeva

Non-human players
This section is for computer programs who are noted in the history of the game.

Chinook (draughts player), a program developed at the University of Alberta (noteworthy match against Marion Tinsley)
KingsRow, a strong program by Ed Gilbert
Nemesis (draughts player), world computer champion in 2002

References

External links
Old Time players page
USA checkers
World Draughts federation
World Checkers/Draughts Federation
Draughts world Grandmaster page
KNDB - Koninklijke Nederlandse Dambond - homepage

 
Draughts